Gaali free India is a social campaign against profanity and the use of abusive words. It started in 2016 with a motive to raise awareness among youth who are unable to control their feelings and find refuge in profanity to vent their feelings and frustration. Claimed to be inspired by Swachh Bharat cleanliness campaign, the Gaali free India campaign aims to build awareness for an abuse free language culture. The campaign being driven by a creative professional uses online graphics and videos on digital platform to drive awareness against profanity in spoken and online interactions and digital media. its adverse impact especially on women and children. The Gaali Free India campaign seeks to stand up to the objectification and sexualization of women.   

In 2016 it was recognized as one of the three most influential social campaigns. The volunteers of the campaign launched an online petition to the Prime Minister of India in 2018 to bring the issue to his attention. In June 2020 Vandana Sethhi, the pioneer of the campaign also covers protest against incidents of domestic violence, rape, acid attacks by using dialogues from popular films. Sethhi says that her campaign insists on Swacch Bhasha Swacch Bharat so that our language and mind is also clean just like our surroundings. So far 50000 people have signed up for her campaign and pledged support by committing not to use abusive words in their language and conversations. The campaign was one of the top 3 campaigns of 2020 to watch out for among others.

References

Social movements in India
2016 establishments in India